Matthew Nile Ashford (born January 29, 1960) is an American actor. He is best known for his roles on the soap operas Days of Our Lives and The Bay, for the former of which he received a nomination for the Daytime Emmy Award for Outstanding Supporting Actor in a Drama Series in 2012.

Career

Soap roles 
Ashford's career began in New York City, where he was cast as Drew Ralston on One Life to Live, a role he played from 1982 to 1983.  He was subsequently cast as Cagney McCleary on Search for Tomorrow, a role Ashford would play until the show's ending in December 1986. 

He is best known for playing Jack Deveraux on the NBC soap opera, Days of Our Lives. Ashford has had several stints playing Jack Deveraux, a popular character who began as a villain and raped another character. In subsequent years, the character of Jack was reformed and paired with Jennifer Horton.  Ashford's pairing with Melissa Reeves' Jennifer was wildly popular (winning the 7th Soap Opera Digest award for favorite super couple) and the couple is considered a supercouple, by soap opera standards.  

Ashford's initial run was from 1987 to 1993. He returned from 2001 to 2003, but was written off as part of a controversial storyline where nearly a dozen residents of the fictional town of Salem appeared to have been murdered. (The complex plot had them alive and held hostage in another country.) He returned to the show in 2004, but had spent much of his time since on the back burner, and was off-screen for large portions of 2005 and 2006. In July 2006, it was announced that Ashford, a fan favorite, had again been let go from the Days of Our Lives cast roster, a story confirmed in the July 25, 2006 edition of industry magazine Soap Opera Digest.  Ashford's last day on Days of our Lives was on September 21, 2006.  Jack and Jennifer bid Salem farewell as they headed off, young son in tow, to live and work in London. Ashford made a brief appearance as Jack in April 2007, and in September 2011 returned to the show on a full-time basis, only to be fired again in April 2012. After guest appearances in 2016 and 2017, Ashford returned to Days of Our Lives as a regular cast member in late 2018. 

Ashford has also appeared on other daytime soaps, including a stint as Tom Hardy on General Hospital from 1995 to 1997, and a return to One Life to Live, this time playing serial killer Stephen Haver from 2003 to 2004. 

Since 2011, Ashford has starred on the soap opera web series The Bay as Steve Jenson, opposite his former Days of Our Lives co-star, Mary Beth Evans.

Other work 
Ashford is part of a production company (NGM Productions).  They have just produced a movie entitled The Unlikeleys.  In it, Ashford plays the most famous soap star in the world and his exact look-alike. Ashford's production company has also produced a movie entitled The Exorcism of Tina Miller, and they are currently working on the distribution details.

Ashford also appeared with Scott Bakula in a production of No Strings in May 2007. Later that year he auditioned with Haysha Deitsch, who later got the role for The Return of Jezebel James.

From February to June 2010, he played Bill in the North American tour of Mamma Mia!. The final performances were cut short due to security concerns with the G20 Summit in Toronto, Ontario, Canada, as the summit location was two blocks away from the theater.

Personal life 
Ashford, the sixth of eight children (three sisters and four brothers), was born in Davenport, Iowa to Patricia (†2020), an executive secretary, and Cecil Ashford, a civil engineer.  He graduated with a B.F.A. in Theater from the North Carolina School of the Arts in Winston-Salem.

Ashford married singer-actress Christina Saffran Ashford on June 6, 1987 but they have since divorced. They have two daughters, Grace  and Emma (born in 1997). In 1997, four-month-old Emma was diagnosed with a rare form of childhood eye cancer, Retinoblastoma. The disease was treated with surgeries to remove the malignant tumors in her eyes and chemotherapy. When she was five, tumors recurred in Emma's left eye, and it was removed and replaced with a prosthetic. Ashford has been instrumental in raising funds and awareness for this disease. He is the spokesperson for the Retinoblastoma International Foundation.

In May 2010, while on tour in Toronto, Ontario, Canada, he obtained US/Canada dual citizenship. Ashford's father was born in Canada, therefore making him and his siblings eligible to become Canadians without relinquishing their American citizenship.

Ashford is in a relationship with Lana Buss and together they have two children — a son, Henry, born in May 2013, and a daughter, Willa, born in December 2015.  Ashford and Buss were married on November 27, 2016.

Awards and recognition 
 2012 Daytime Emmy Award Outstanding Supporting Actor in a Drama Series (Days of Our Lives) - Nomination
 1993 Soap Opera Digest Award Outstanding Comic Performance (Days of Our Lives)
 1992 Soap Opera Digest Award Best Love Story Daytime or Primetime (with Melissa Reeves) (Days of Our Lives)
 1992 Soap Opera Digest Award Best Daytime Wedding (with Melissa Reeves) (Days of Our Lives)
 1991 Soap Opera Digest Award Favorite Daytime Super Couple (with Melissa Reeves) (Days of Our Lives)
 1989 Soap Opera Digest Award Outstanding Daytime Villain (Days of Our Lives)

Filmography

Film

Television

See also
 Days of Our Lives
 Jack Deveraux and Jennifer Horton
 Supercouple

References

External links

 Matthew Ashford profile from DAYS Online
 Retinoblastoma International foundation homepage
 The Unlikely's website (A film co-produced and starring Matt Ashford)
 No Strings playbill

American male film actors
American male soap opera actors
American male television actors
Male actors from Iowa
1960 births
Living people
People from Davenport, Iowa
20th-century American male actors
21st-century American male actors
University of North Carolina School of the Arts alumni